Craig Pettigrew (born 25 November 1986 in Irvine), is a Scottish footballer who plays as a centre-back for Kilwinning Rangers in the West of Scotland Super League Premier Division. He has previously played for Stranraer and Auchinleck Talbot (twice), Dumbarton and Ayr United.

Career
Craig, predominantly a right back and centre-back began his career at Ayr United making 18 appearances. He was released by the club in Summer 2008, and joined Auchinleck Talbot, he spent five years with the West of Scotland Super League Premier Division side winning the Junior Cup three times.

In June 2014 he joined Scottish League One side Stranraer. After two seasons with the Stair Park men he joined Scottish Championship side Dumbarton on a one-year deal, however, he left the club in January 2017 after his contract was cancelled by mutual consent. Shortly after leaving Dumbarton, Pettigrew re-signed for League One side Stranraer. He left the club in May 2017, rejoining Auchinleck a month later. He left Talbot after three months, and joined Kilwinning Rangers.

References

External links

1986 births
Living people
Association football defenders
Auchinleck Talbot F.C. players
Ayr United F.C. players
Dumbarton F.C. players
Kilwinning Rangers F.C. players
Footballers from Irvine, North Ayrshire
Stranraer F.C. players
Scottish Football League players
Scottish footballers
Scottish Professional Football League players
Scottish Junior Football Association players
Scotland junior international footballers
West of Scotland Football League players